Lipienica may refer to the following places in Poland:
Lipienica, Lower Silesian Voivodeship (south-west Poland)
Lipienica, Golub-Dobrzyń County in Kuyavian-Pomeranian Voivodeship (north-central Poland)
Lipienica, Świecie County in Kuyavian-Pomeranian Voivodeship (north-central Poland)
Lipienica, Lubusz Voivodeship (west Poland)